The 2010 Grand Prix of Mosport presented by Mobil 1 was the penultimate round of the 2010 American Le Mans Series season. It took place at Mosport International Raceway on August 29, 2010. The race marked the 100th ALMS race that David Brabham has competed in. As a result, the Patrón Highcroft team changed the car's number to No. 100 from No. 1 to mark the occasion.

Qualifying

Qualifying result
Pole position winners in each class are marked in bold.

Race
The race was scheduled for two hours and 45 minutes; however, the race was stopped early after a major crash involving the #8 Drayson LMP and #48 Orbit GTC about two hours into the race.  Following a lengthy red flag period, race officials decided to end the event early due to repairs to the track barriers projected to take nearly three hours.  The race was resumed under caution for a single lap before the checkered flag was shown.  For its part in the incident, the #8 Drayson entry was demoted to the last car on their lap, demoting them two places. (The two cars ahead of the Drayson entry were LMPC cars, so the LMP standings were unaffected.)

Race result
Class winners in bold.  Cars failing to complete 70% of their class winner's distance are marked as Not Classified (NC).

References

External links
 2010 Grand Prix of Mosport Race Broadcast (American Le Mans Series YouTube Channel)

Grand Prix of Mosport
Mosport
2010 in Canadian motorsport